Alexandru Slusari (born 11 July 1974) is a Moldovan politician.

Biography 
He was the chairman of the Republican Association of the Agricultural Producers “UniAgroProtect” (2010-2017). Before, from 2013 by 2015, he was the deputy head of the People Force Party (foregoer of the Dignity and Truth Platform). In 2014, at the Parliamentary elections, he was number two on this list of this party. In 2019, at the parliamentary elections, he was within ACUM Block on the election uninominal constituency no. 28 of the Chișinău. In the new legislature he held one out of four deputy head positions and preside over the Inquiry Committee on clearing up all the circumstances of robbing the Republic of Moldova banking system and banking fraud investigation.

He is married and has one child.

References 

Members of the parliament of Moldova
Politicians from Chișinău
1974 births
Living people